Eva Steen (née Eva Oscarsdatter Jacobsen, November 12, 1889 – March 30, 1973) was a Norwegian actress.

Steen was born in Strømsø. She was the daughter of Oscar Jacobsen and Laura Sofie Fredrikke Jacobsen (née Dahl).

Filmography

1933: Vi som går kjøkkenveien as Aunt Alexandra
1934: Sangen om Rondane as the aunt
1934: Syndere i sommersol as a patient
1936: Vi bygger landet  as Mrs. Larsen
1937: Bra mennesker as Mrs. Haldorsen
1937: By og land hand i hand as Katrina Larsen
1939: Familien på Borgan as the wholesaler's wife
1941: Den forsvundne pølsemaker as Mrs. H. Brand
1949: Gategutter
1951: Kranes konditori as Mrs. Buck
1953: Brudebuketten as the lady in the lingerie shop
1957: Stevnemøte med glemte år
1957: The Violators as Jean

Theater roles (selected) 
1938: Non ti conosco più (Norwegian title: Jeg kjenner deg ikke) by Aldo De Benedetti at the Oslo New Theater as Rosita Lawrence
1946: Arsenic and Old Lace (Norwegian title: Arsenikk og gamle kniplinger) by Joseph Kesselring at the Oslo New Theater as an old woman

References

External links
 
 Eva Steen at the Swedish Film Database
 Eva Steen at Filmfront
 Eva Steen at Sceneweb

1889 births
1973 deaths
20th-century Norwegian actresses
People from Drammen